Maseok Station is a railway station on the Gyeongchun Line in South Korea.

External links
 Station information from Korail

Railway stations in Gyeonggi Province
Seoul Metropolitan Subway stations
Metro stations in Namyangju
Railway stations opened in 1939